Sava is a region in northern Madagascar. Its capital is Sambava. Until 2009 Sava belonged to Antsiranana Province. The region is situated at the northern part of the east coast of Madagascar. It is bordered by the region Diana to the north, Sofia to the west, and Analanjirofo to the south. The region contains wild areas such as Marojejy National Park.

The name of the region is composed of the initial letters of its four principal towns: Sambava, Antalaha, Iharana (Vohimaro), and Andapa. Each of these towns claims itself the World Capital of Vanilla, a spice of which the region is the largest producer of in the world (especially the highly sought-after Bourbon vanilla variety).

The economic importance of vanilla cultivation in the Sava Region encouraged the reconstruction of the road that connects the towns, called the Route de la vanille (The Vanilla Route), in the latter half of 2005. However, due to the volatile fluctuations in the price of vanilla, in turn often caused by the dramatic cyclones occurring in the southwestern Indian Ocean, many poor vanilla farmers in the Sava Region have periodically been forced to resort to the mostly illegal logging of ebony, palisander, and rosewood.

Administrative divisions
Sava Region is divided into four districts, which are subdivided into 75 communes:

 Andapa District - 17 communes
 Antalaha District - 14 communes
 Sambava District - 25 communes
 Vohemar District (Iharana District) - 19 communes

Transport

Airports
Andapa Airport
Antalaha Airport
Doany Airport
Sambava Airport
Iharana Airport

Roads 
This region is crossed by 454 km of national roads:
National road 5a from North to South (Daraina, Vohemar, Sambava, Antalaha)
National road 3b from Sambava to Andapa (97km)
National road 53  from Antalaha to the Antsirabato Airport (12 km)
National road 59a - from RN 5a to Vohemar (3km)
furthermore by 520 km provincial roads (RIP) and 230 km of roads without a classification.

Ports
There are regional ports in Vohemar and Antsalaha.

Protected areas
Loky Manambato New Protected Area
Makirovana Tsihomanaomby New Protected Area
Marojejy National Park
Part of Masoala National Park
Anjanaharibe-Sud Reserve
 Part of Makira Natural Park
Part of COMATSA Avaratra New Protected Area
Part of COMATSA Atsimo New Protected Area
Macolline Park (private)

Rivers
The main rivers of the Sava Region are (north to south):
Manambato River
Manambaty River
Fanambana River
Bemarivo River
Androranga River
Lokoho River
Onive River
Ankavanana

References

EDBM

External links
 Sava Region – official site

 
Regions of Madagascar